Cataldo is an unincorporated community in Kootenai and Shoshone counties in northern Idaho. Cataldo lies on the southeast banks of the Coeur d'Alene River and Interstate 90 passes the south side of the community. The community of Kingston lies along I-90 to the east. The ZIP Code for Cataldo is 83810.

History
The nearby area was the site of the Cataldo Mission which lies west of the river in Kootenai County. It is a former mission established by the Jesuits and is a national historic landmark that is the site of the oldest building in the state of Idaho.

Cataldo's population was estimated at 100 in 1909 and was also 100 in 1960.

References

Unincorporated communities in Kootenai County, Idaho
Unincorporated communities in Shoshone County, Idaho
Unincorporated communities in Idaho